Dudu Phukwana and the "Spears" is the debut album by South African saxophonist Dudu Pukwana and his band, the "Spears." Produced by Joe Boyd, it was recorded in 1968 at Sound Techniques in London, and was initially released on vinyl in 1969 by Quality Records, a subsidiary of the Trutone label. In 2020, the album was remastered and reissued by Matsuli Music as a double-LP set with nine previously-unissued tracks that were recorded in 1969, and that feature a number of guest artists such as Fairport Convention's Richard Thompson and Simon Nicol.

Pukwana's name was misspelled on the album cover despite the fact that the master tape boxes bear the correct spelling. Identification of personnel on the recordings was largely based on educated guesses by liner note author Richard Haslop, as session notes could not be located.

Reception

Regarding the 2020 reissue, Jazz Journal'''s Brian Morton wrote: "The South African influence on British jazz is immeasurable and still evolving. The reappearance of this now-remote LP marks a moment for new reflection on a complex legacy, and a story criss-crossed by hope, tragedy, great longing and an irrepressible zest for life and music."

In a review for Financial Times, David Honigmann called the original release "one of the unheralded classics of South African jazz," and described the additional tracks as "a happily discovered treasure."

Tyler Wilcox of Aquarium Drunkard commented: "A total blast of positive vibrations from way back in the 1960s... Pukwana is rightly the star here and his playing is luminous and joyful throughout; you can't listen to this collection without it improving your mood considerably."

Writing for UK Vibe, Brian Homer noted the album's "compelling historical and cultural value," and remarked: "If anyone thinks that no jazz these days can make you feel good and want to get up and dance then they had better listen to this record... All the music is impressive, insistent and infectious... It's worthy of being a museum piece except that the music is too alive and vital for that."

In an article for New Frame, Gwen Ansell called the tracks on the original release "a delight for 2020 ears," and noted that "in the incomplete jigsaw puzzle that is South African jazz history, every reissue adds a vital missing piece." She stated that the music "tell[s] of the formative years of a brilliant composer: songs such as 'Kuthwasi Hlobo' stick in the memory, heralding the simultaneously nostalgic and hopeful power of In the Townships'', created six years later."

2020 reissue track listings

 Disc 1
 "Pezulu (Way Up)" – 5:54
 "Thulula (Fill It Up)" – 3:20
 "Kuthwasi Hlobo (Spring)" – 3:37
 "Half Moon" – 3:40
 "Yini Njalo (Stick Around)" – 2:16
 "Kwa Thula (Thula's Place)" – 3:41
 "Joe's Jika (Joe's Groove)" – 3:46
 "Nobomvu (Red Head)" – 5:02
 "Qonqoza (Knock)" – 4:42
 "Phola (Cool It!)" – 3:31

Disc 1 personnel
Confirmed:
 Dudu Pukwana – alto saxophone
 Bob Stuckey – organ and bass pedals
 Louis Moholo – drums
Likely:
 Teddy Osei – tenor sax
 Mongezi Feza – trumpet
 Phil Lee – guitar
 Chris McGregor – piano
 Harry Miller – bass
Possible:
 Dudu Pukwana – tenor sax and piano
 Jonas Gwangwa – trombone
 Remi Kabaka – drums or percussion
 Jimmy Scott – percussion
 Tunji Oyelana – drums or percussion

Disc 2
 "Pezulu (Extended Take)" – 6:23
 "Pezulu (Alternate Take)" – 5:47
 "Studio Interlude" – 0:17
 "Half Moon" – 3:39
 "Zulu Liyaduduma" – 3:32
 "Sibuyile (Take One)" – 2:29
 "Sibuyile (Take Two)" – 2:24
 "Church Mouse" – 2:46
 "Untitled (Andromeda)" – 2:49

Disc 2 personnel
Confirmed:
 Dudu Pukwana – alto saxophone
 Mongezi Feza – trumpet
 Richard Thompson – guitar
 Simon Nicol – guitar
 Bob Stuckey – organ and bass pedals
 Harry Miller – bass
 Louis Moholo – drums
 Joe Mogotsi – vocals
Likely:
 Teddy Osei – tenor sax
 Phil Lee – guitar
 Chris McGregor – piano
 Mamsie (Mthombeni) Gwangwa – vocals
Possible:
 Dudu Pukwana – tenor sax
 Jonas Gwangwa – trombone
 Remi Kabaka – drums or percussion
 Jimmy Scott – percussion
 Tunji Oyelana – drums or percussion

References

1969 albums
Dudu Pukwana albums
Albums produced by Joe Boyd